Senator Hertzberg may refer to:

Harry Hertzberg (1883–1940), Texas State Senate
Robert Hertzberg (born 1954), California State Senate